Rosalía Vázquez (born 11 October 1985) is a Cuban female discus thrower, who won an individual gold medal at the Youth World Championships.

References

External links

1985 births
Living people
Cuban female discus throwers
21st-century Cuban women